Enzo Ide (born 22 June 1991 in Tielt) is a Belgian racing driver.

Racing career
Ide began his racing career in Belcar, racing a Porsche 997 GT3 for Prospeed Competition, together with Ruben Maes. For 2011 he stepped up to the FIA GT3 European Championship, driving an Audi R8 LMS for Belgian Audi Club Team WRT. Sharing with Gregory Franchi for the first five rounds, he won races at the Autódromo Internacional do Algarve and the Circuito de Navarra. Franchi switched to the team's other car for the final round at Circuit Park Zandvoort, and Ide was partnered by Christopher Haase – winning the second race of the weekend. Ide finished third in the drivers' championship. He also continued racing in Belcar, also for WRT alongside François Verbist. The pair finished third in the final standings, winning the 24 Hours of Zolder together with Bert Longin and Xavier Maassen.

In 2012, Ide was racing in the FIA GT1 World Championship. He was driving a Ferrari 458 Italia GT3 for AF Corse, with reigning GT3 champion Francesco Castellacci as his co-driver.

In 2013, Enzo was racing in the FIA GT Series  with Anthony Kumpen and the Blancpain Endurance Series with Anthony Kumpen and Markus Winkelhock. Both championships were driven with the same Audi R8 LMS GT3 from Phoenix Racing GmbH.

In 2018, Ide will compete in the FIA World Rallycross Championship with Comtoyou Racing driving an Audi S1

Personal
Ide is the son of entrepreneur Joris Ide. He made the national media in Belgium after footage from his 18th birthday party laid on by his father was found on YouTube.

Racing record

FIA GT competition results

GT1 World Championship results

FIA GT Series results

Complete FIA World Rallycross Championship results
(key)

Supercar/RX1

References

External links

1991 births
Living people
People from Tielt
Belgian racing drivers
FIA GT1 World Championship drivers
Blancpain Endurance Series drivers
International GT Open drivers
ADAC GT Masters drivers
24 Hours of Spa drivers
World Rallycross Championship drivers
24H Series drivers
Sportspeople from West Flanders
AF Corse drivers
Phoenix Racing drivers
W Racing Team drivers
21st-century Belgian people
GT4 European Series drivers